The Hewlett-Woodmere Public School District, Union Free School District 14, is located in the southwest section of Nassau County, New York and borders the New York City borough of Queens.  Communities in the district include, in full or in part, Hewlett, Woodmere, Woodsburgh, North Woodmere an unincorporated area of Valley Stream, the Gibson section of Valley Stream, Hewlett Harbor, Hewlett Neck, and Hewlett Bay Park, as well as parts of Lynbrook, all comprise the geographical boundaries for the school district.  There are approximately 4,400 students enrolled in pre-K through 12th grade. The district is operated under the supervision of a seven-member Board of Education.

History
The School District was created by the New York Legislature in 1898.  As early as 1850 there was a one-room school house in the area.  As the area grew rapidly in the postwar period, 4 schools were built between 1949 and 1961.

Schools
The district consists of the following schools:
Elementary Schools
Franklin Early Childhood Center Grades PreK-1
Hewlett Elementary School Grades 2-5
Ogden Elementary School Grades 2-5
Middle School
Woodmere Middle School Grades 6-8
High School
George W. Hewlett High School (commonly known as Hewlett High School) Grades 9-12.

Administration
Dr. Ralph Marino Jr. - Superintendent
Mr. Louis Frontario - Assistant Superintendent, Business
Dr. Edwin Fale - Assistant Superintendent, Human Resources & Student Services
Dr. Mark Secaur - Deputy Superintendent

Demographics
On December 3, 2006, Newsday reported that of 3,327 students, 84.3% are white, 1.8% are black 6.2% are Hispanic and 7.7% are "other."

Awards and recognition
Recent Awards and Achievements include:

Hewlett High School named one of Newsweek's Top 25 High Schools in New York
One 2012 Semi-Finalist in the National Merit Scholarship Program
Six National Merit Commended Students
Two National Hispanic Recognition Program Scholars
Hewlett High School Business Department Named Department of the Year, 2006 & 2011
Hewlett High School Business Teacher, Mr. Jared Pittelli, named Outstanding Teacher of the Year
Hewlett High School named Blue Star School by W!se
Hewlett High School named a Grammy Signature School Semi-Finalist for 2012.

References

External links
Hewlett-Woodmere Public School District
George W. Hewlett High School
National Center for Education Statistics data for the Hewlett-Woodmere School District
Hewlett High School Alumni Association
Hewlett High School Alumni Site
Hewlett High School Class of 1974
Hewlett High School Class of 1961

School districts in New York (state)
Education in Nassau County, New York
School districts established in 1898